Periploca graeca, the silkvine, is an ornamental plant in the family Apocynaceae. It is native to southern Europe and the Middle East, and is sparingly naturalized in scattered locations in the eastern United States.

References

External links

Periploca graeca photo
Periploca graeca - ibiblio.org

Periplocoideae
Garden plants
Vines
Plants described in 1753
Taxa named by Carl Linnaeus